Hibbertia guttata is a species of flowering plant in the family Dilleniaceae and is endemic to the Northern Territory. It is a straggly shrub with moderately to densely hairy foliage, linear to elliptic leaves, and yellow flowers arranged in leaf axils with 28 to 36 stamens arranged in groups around the three carpels.

Description
There are twenty-eight to thirty-six stamens arranged in groups with a few staminodes, around the three carpels, each carpel with two ovules.

Taxonomy
Hibbertia guttata was first formally described in 2010 by Hellmut R. Toelken in the Journal of the Adelaide Botanic Gardens from specimens collected by Lyndley Craven on the Arnhem Land Plateau in 1973. The specific epithet (guttata) means "spotted", referring to the pale scales scattered over the whole plant.

Distribution and habitat
This hibbertia grows in woodland and shrubland, often in sheltered places between rocks, in Kakadu National Park and Arnhem Land in the northern part of the Northern Territory.

Conservation status
Hibbertia guttata is classified as "near threatened" under the Territory Parks and Wildlife Conservation Act 1976.

See also
List of Hibbertia species

References

guttata
Flora of the Northern Territory
Plants described in 2010
Taxa named by Hellmut R. Toelken